Pimpin' Ain't Dead is the fifth studio album by American hip hop group Do Or Die. It was released on August 19, 2003, via Rap-A-Lot Records. Recording sessions took place at CWAL MOB Recordings in Illinois and at Noddfactor Studios in Texas. Production was handled by The Legendary Traxster, except for one song, "In A Minute", which was produced by Mr. Lee. It features guest appearances from Johnny P., the Legendary Traxster, Dun D, E.C. Illa, Navee, Twista and Z-Ro. The album peaked at number 115 on the Billboard 200 and number 17 on the Top R&B/Hip-Hop Albums chart in the United States.

Track listing

Personnel
Anthony "N.A.R.D." Round – vocals (tracks: 1-8, 10, 12)
Darnell "Belo Zero" Smith – vocals (tracks: 1-3, 5-9, 11-12)
Dennis "AK47" Round – vocals (tracks: 5-8, 12)
R. "E.C. Illa/White Folks" Codell – vocals (track 1)
Carl "Twista" Mitchell – vocals (track 2)
John "Johnny P" Pigram – vocals (tracks: 2, 5, 9)
Samuel "The Legendary Traxster" Lindley – vocals (tracks: 4, 6), additional vocals (track 12), producer (tracks: 1-9, 11, 12), mixing, engineering
L. "Dun D" Lindley – vocals (track 6)
Navee – vocals (track 10)
Joseph "Z-Ro" McVey IV – vocals (track 10)
Lauren Gaines – backing vocals (track 3)
Connie Jr. – backing vocals (track 12)
Leroy "Mr. Lee" Williams – producer (track 10), engineering
Mike Dean – mixing, mastering
James "J. Prince" Smith – executive producer
Mike Frost – artwork, design, photography, layout
Tony "Big Chief" Randle – A&R
Anzel "Int'l Red" Jennings – A&R

Charts

References

External links

2003 albums
Do or Die (group) albums
Rap-A-Lot Records albums
Albums produced by The Legendary Traxster